The Fairview City Jail is a former jail building located in Handy Park at 120 1st Street in Fairview, Oregon, in the United States. It was built in 1915, next to the old Fairview City Hall at 60 Main Street.  It is a simple, rectangular, concrete building, 10 feet by 20 feet, with 8 foot high walls painted with a grey paint.  It has a low pitched concrete slab roof with shallow gable ends. It was added to the National Register of Historic Places in 2016.

See also
 National Register of Historic Places listings in Multnomah County, Oregon

References

External links
 

1915 establishments in Oregon
Government buildings completed in 1915
Jails on the National Register of Historic Places in Oregon
National Register of Historic Places in Multnomah County, Oregon